Claude-Aimé Desprez-Saint-Clair (5 April 1783 – 26 April 1824) was a French vaudeville playwright and chansonnier. He himself performed comedy plays and, around 1810, joined the troupe of the Théâtre de l'Ambigu-Comique under the name Saint-Clair. He died in April 1824 from tuberculosis.

Works 
 Le Foyer ou le Couplet d'annonce, with Varez, vaudeville presented at the Théâtre des Jeunes-Artistes.
 Kikiki, with Brazier and Varez, parody of Tékêli, presented at the Nouveaux-Troubadours.
 Le Mariage de la Valeur, vaudeville, presented at the Ambigu-Comique.
 L'Espoir réalisé, vaudeville, ibid.
 Le Jardin d'Oliviers, ibid.
 Le Mariage sous d'heureux auspices, with Ferrière, vaudeville in 1 act, on the occasion of the marriage of the Duke of Beni, presented at the Ambigu-Comique, Paris, 1816, in-8°.
 Marguerite de Straffort, ou le Retour à la royauté, with the same, melodrama in 3 acts, in prose, presented on the same stage, Paris, 1816, in-8°.
 Retournons à Paris, with Varez, comedy in 1 act mingled with vaudevilles, presented on the same stage, Paris, 1817, in-8°.
 Grégoire à Tunis, with Ferrière, vaudeville presented at the Ambigu-Comique.
 Monsieur de la Hure, vaudeville given at the Théâtre de la Gaîté.
 L'Homme à tout, with an anonymous author, vaudeville, Théâtre de la Gaîté.
 Les Épaulettes de grenadier, with Edmond, comedy in 1 act, mingled with vaudevilles, Théâtre de la Porte-Saint-Martin, Paris, 1820, in-8°.
 Paris, with Edmond, Crosnier and Émile de Plugette, impromptu mingled with couplets, on the occasion of the birth of his Royal Highness the Duke of Bordeaux, Théâtre de la Porte-Saint-Martin, 29 September 1820, Paris, 1820, in-8°.
 Le Bouffon dans l'embarras, with Ferrière, vaudeville, Théâtre des Variétés.
 Les Ermites, with Edmond Crosnier and Michel-Nicolas Balisson de Rougemont, comédie en vaudevilles in 1 act, Théâtre de la Porte-Saint-Martin, Paris, 1821, in-8°.
 Le Protégé de tout le monde, with J. Dusaulchoy and Alexandre-Joseph Le Roy de Bacre, comédie en vaudevilles in 1 act, Théâtre de la Porte-Saint-Martin, 12 November 1822, Paris, 1822, in-8°.
 Le Mariage à la turque, vaudeville in 1 act, Paris, 1823, in-8°.
 Malbrouck, folie-vaudeville.
 La Grotte de Fingal, ou le Soldat mystérieux.

Sources 
 Joseph-François Michaud: Biographie universelle ancienne et moderne, t. 10, Paris, Madame C. Desplaces, 1852, 603 p.

19th-century French dramatists and playwrights
French male stage actors
French chansonniers
People from Saint-Germain-en-Laye
1783 births
1824 deaths